Tall Tales may refer to:

 Tall Tales (Royal Wood album), 2004
 Tall Tales (Hot Club of Cowtown album), by American band The Hot Club of Cowtown
 Tall Tales, 2017 film
 "Tall Tales" (Supernatural), an episode of the television series Supernatural

See also
 Tall Tales & Legends, an American TV series
 The Tall Tales of Vishnu Sharma
 Tall tale
 Tall Tale (film), a 1995 Western adventure fantasy film